João Victor may refer to:

João Victor (footballer, born 1988), Brazilian football defensive midfielder for Hyderabad
João Victor (footballer, born 1994), Brazilian football winger for  Wolfsburg
João Victor (footballer, born 1997), Brazilian football defender for Vitória
João Victor (footballer, born 1998), Brazilian football defender for Nantes
João Victor (footballer, born 1999), Brazilian football winger for Nacional
João Victor (footballer, born 2000), Brazilian football defender for Baniyas
João Victor (footballer, born 2002), Brazilian football defender for Athletico Paranaense
João Victor (footballer, born 2004), Brazilian football forward for Ceará
João Bravim, or João Victor Donna Bravim (born 1998), Brazilian football goalkeeper